Gordon Michael Woolvett (born 1970) is a Canadian actor from Hamilton, Ontario.

Career
Woolvett's most enduring role was as Seamus Zelazny Harper on the television series Andromeda (2000–2005). Prior to Andromeda he starred in another science fiction television series, Deepwater Black. He was also credited as playing Mitch in the "Pariah" episode of the short-lived 1980s science-fiction/action series Captain Power and the Soldiers of the Future. He was in two episodes of Psi Factor: Chronicles of the Paranormal.

Woolvett was also one of the first program jockeys for YTV's The Zone (then called The After-School Zone) and the original main host for a program called Video & Arcade Top 10 which also aired on YTV. He acted in the 1999 made-for-TV film Ultimate Deception with Yasmine Bleeth. He also appeared on the Canadian television series The Guard, which aired from 2008 to 2009 on Global Television Network.

In 1992, Woolvett was nominated for the Gemini Award for Best Performance by a Supporting Actor for his role in Princes in Exile (1990). He directed the documentary Around the World in 80 Anthems, which won Best Documentary at the seventh International Film Festival Manhattan in 2017.

In 2020, Woolvett began teaching acting, improv, scene study, movie making, screenwriting and performance to young actors aged 9–18 on the Outschool homeschooling platform. His first year brought more than 70 five-star reviews from parents and students.

Personal life
Woolvett was born in 1970 in Hamilton, Ontario, Canada. He married Michele Morand on January 15, 2000. His brother is actor Jaimz Woolvett. He has three children.

Filmography

Film

Television

References

External links
 
 
 Woolvett's Facebook site
 Gordon Woolvett's Teacher Page on Outschool

1970 births
Living people
Canadian male film actors
Canadian male television actors
Canadian male voice actors
Global Television Network people
Male actors from Hamilton, Ontario
Date of birth missing (living people)